Peter Henderson is the name of:

Peter Henderson (Australian public servant) (1928–2016), Secretary of the Australian Government Department of Foreign Affairs 1979 to 1984
Peter Henderson, Baron Henderson of Brompton (1922–2000), British public servant
Peter Henderson (cricketer) (1965–2010), Australian cricketer
Peter Henderson (footballer) (born 1952), English footballer
Peter Henderson (sportsman) (1926–2014), New Zealand athlete and rugby player
Peter Henderson (computer scientist), Professor of Computer Science at Southampton University from 1987 to 2009

See also 
Henderson (surname)